Laisa is a feminine given name. Notable people with the name include:

Laisa Digitaki, Fijian businesswoman
Laisa Lerus (born 1975), French handball player
Laisa Vulakoro (born 1960), Fijian singer

See also
Raisa (given name)

Feminine given names